Kiplinger is an American publisher of business forecasts and personal finance advice which is a subsidiary of Future plc.

Kiplinger Washington Editors, Inc., was a closely held company managed for more than nine decades by three generations of the Kiplinger family, until its sale in February 2019 to Dennis Publishing, a U.K.-based media company.

In 2021, Future plc acquired Dennis Publishing and with it including Kiplinger.

History
W. M. Kiplinger (1891–1967), a former AP economics reporter, founded the eponymous Washington, D.C. company in 1920. With his son Austin H. Kiplinger (1918–2015) he co-founded Kiplinger's Personal Finance Magazine in 1947. Grandson Knight A. Kiplinger continued the dynasty until the 2019 sale to Dennis Publishing.

Products
Its best-known publications are The Kiplinger Letter, a weekly business and economic forecasting periodical for people in management, and the monthly Kiplinger's Personal Finance magazine.

Kiplinger also provides custom publishing services to a variety of companies and associations.

References

External links
 

Business newsletters
Privately held companies based in Washington, D.C.
Publishing companies established in 1920
Magazine publishing companies of the United States
2019 mergers and acquisitions
2021 mergers and acquisitions